Asil Attar  is an Iraqi businesswoman and former CEO of Damas Jewellery.

Early life and career
Asil Attar was born in Baghdad and is from Iraqi, Iranian and Indian heritage. She is a businesswoman in the fashion industry, with industry experience in London, New York and Europe focused on talent management, brand building, business restructuring, development and expansion.

Attar has been the opening speaker and panelist for conferences in the Middle East region, including Arabian Business Women's Forum, Asian Leadership Awards, Women in Leadership Conference, The Luxury Forum, Cityscape Global, the CSR Summit 2013, the Host for Google Grind Dubai and as a speaker at the World Islamic Economic Forum and their Foundation program the Mocafest. She was on the advisory boards for the Asia Retail Congress and Future Retail. In 2020, she launched "The Turban Thinker", a talk show for entrepreneurs, in which she shared her journey and welcomed guests.

Awards and recognitions
Attar was listed as one of the top 100 most powerful Arab women in 2012 by Arabian Business magazine as well as being voted number 55 in the Forbes Middle East rankings of the most powerful Arabic women in the world.

References

Living people
Businesspeople in fashion
Year of birth missing (living people)
People from Baghdad
Iraqi women
Iraqi businesspeople